The Henley-Putnam School of Strategic Security, previously Henley-Putnam University, is a school of National American University, a private for-profit online university. It focuses on intelligence management, counterterrorism studies, and protection management. Henley-Putnam offers over 150 courses, 7 degree programs, and 31 certificate programs. Faculty members tend to have real-world knowledge from working in the intelligence/defense industry.

History 
The original university was conceived and founded by Nirmalya Bhowmick, with co-founders Michael Corcoran and Sheldon Greaves. 

The school was named to honor American Revolutionary War intelligence officers Colonel David Henley and General Israel Putnam, each of whom personified a different approach to the practice of espionage. Henley, contemplative and precise, specialized in organizing streams of raw data and extrapolating from it an enemy’s strengths and weaknesses. Putnam focused on acquiring intelligence through the active use of agents, debriefing deserters, and interrogating prisoners.

In July 2006, Liberty Capital Partners, a private equity firm, acquired Henley-Putnam.  

Henley-Putnam's enrollment grew from 125 students in 2008 to 515 students by the summer of 2010.

Acquisition by National American University Holdings
National American University purchased Henley-Putnam University on July 21, 2017.

Academics
The school has a curriculum of more than 150 courses, with six bachelor's and master's degree programs, a doctorate program, and certificates in seven subject areas. Its faculty comes from the military, law enforcement, and the counterterrorism and intelligence communities, with an emphasis on "real world experience".

Alumni
 Nick Freitas – Virginia state lawmaker

References

Distance education institutions based in the United States
Educational institutions established in 2001
2001 establishments in South Dakota